Stephen Anthony Anthrobus (born 10 November 1968) is an English former professional footballer who played as a striker. Active in both England and Wales between 1986 and 2003, Anthrobus made nearly 300 career League appearances.

Career
Born in Lewisham, Anthrobus played with the youth team of Millwall, turning professional in 1986. He was a semi-regular member of the first team when they won promotion to the First Division in 1988. After their relegation back to the Second Division two years later, he stayed in the First Division when signing for Wimbledon, but failed to score a single goal in 28 league appearances for the club over the next four seasons.

In 1994, he was transferred to Peterborough United, later turning out for Chester City, Shrewsbury Town, Crewe Alexandra, Oxford United and Total Network Solutions. In 2003, he became player-manager of Hednesford Town, a position he held until May 2006.

Honours
Hednesford Town
FA Trophy: 2003–04

References

1968 births
Living people
English footballers
Millwall F.C. players
Wimbledon F.C. players
Peterborough United F.C. players
Chester City F.C. players
Shrewsbury Town F.C. players
Crewe Alexandra F.C. players
Oxford United F.C. players
The New Saints F.C. players
Hednesford Town F.C. players
Premier League players
English Football League players
English football managers
Cymru Premier players
Footballers from the London Borough of Lewisham
Black British sportsmen
Hednesford Town F.C. managers
Association football forwards